The Women's 400 metre freestyle competition at the 2017 World Championships was held on 23 July 2017.

Records
Prior to the competition, the existing world and championship records were as follows.

The following new records were set during this competition.

Results

Heats
The heats were held at 10:52.

Final
The final was held at 18:03.

References

Women's 400 metre freestyle
2017 in women's swimming